This is a list of the freemen of the City of Gloucester.

17th-century
 1653 - Robert Payne, member of Parliament.
 1658 - Ralph Wallis, nonconformist pamphleteer, known as "the Cobler of Gloucester".

18th-century
 1762 - Benjamin Hyett.
 1782 - John Phillpotts, land agent.
 1789 - George Worrall Counsel, lawyer and antiquarian.

19th-century
 1835 - George Viner Ellis, anatomist.

References

Further reading
 Langley-Smith, W. (1902) The Freemen of the City of Gloucester and the Corporation: A short history.
 Anon. (1950) "The Freemen of Gloucester": An Account of the Chartered Freemen of the City of Gloucester.
 Ripley, Peter, & John Jurica (Ed.) (1991) A Calendar of the Registers of the Freemen of the City of Gloucester 1641-1838. Bristol and Gloucestershire Archaeological Society.

External links 
http://www.gloucesterfreemenandwomen.co.uk/
https://www.visit-gloucestershire.co.uk/directory/listing/chartered-freemen-women-of-the-city-of-gloucester
https://discovery.nationalarchives.gov.uk/details/r/4ed3ea9f-cc89-41ae-a5b4-c0660027dba0

Gloucester
Glou
Gloucester